VfB Stuttgart II is a German football team located in Stuttgart, currently playing in the Regionalliga Südwest. From 2008 to 2016 the team played in the 3. Liga. They are the reserve team of VfB Stuttgart. Until 2005 the team played under the name of VfB Stuttgart Amateure.

History
VfB Stuttgart Amateure first made an appearance at the highest level of local amateur football, the third division Amateurliga Württemberg, in 1959–60, winning the league. The league was split into two regional divisions and the team was grouped in the Amateurliga Nordwürttemberg where it became a dominating side from 1962 to 1967, winning four league titles in five seasons but being barred from promotion to the professional leagues above. The team stayed in this league until 1978, winning one more title in 1971 and generally achieving top of the table finishes but failing to qualify for the new Oberliga Baden-Württemberg by a point when it came sixth and a top five finish was required.

The team's league championships in the Amateurliga and Amateur-Oberliga entitled it to take part in the German amateur football championship, which it won in 1963 and 1980, beating VfL Wolfsburg and FC Augsburg in the finals, while it finished runners-up in 1971 when it lost to SC Jülich 1910.

The team came second in the new Verbandsliga Württemberg in 1979 and was promoted to the Oberliga. It won a championship in this league in its first season there but was again barred from promotion. It came second the season after but suffered relegation in 1988. After two seasons in the Verbandsliga it returned to the Oberliga in 1990. it failed to qualify when the Regionalliga Süd was introduced as the third tier of league football in 1994 but won promotion to this league in 1998 after an Oberliga championship. It dropped back to Oberliga level in 2002 but won another Oberliga title in 2003 and spend the next five seasons in the Regionalliga again. In 2008 the club qualified for the 3. Liga, the new third tier of league football in Germany, where itplayed for the next eight seasons, generally as a mid- and lower table side. At the end of the 2015–16 season the club was relegated to the tier four Regionalliga Südwest after coming last in the 3. Liga.

The team has also qualified for the first round of the German Cup through the Württemberg Cup and has been, at times, quite successful. In their first participation in 1974–75 it reached the quarter finals before going out to Borussia Dortmund. It was knocked out in the first round in 1975–76 and 1980–81 and in the second round in 1981–82. It made another first round exit the year after when it lost to local rival Stuttgarter Kickers. In 2000–01 it defeated Bundesliga side Eintracht Frankfurt 6–1 in the first round before being drawn against its own first team in the second round and losing 3–0. The following season it made another first round exit and, since 2008, is, like all reserve teams in Germany, barred from the competition.

Relationship with VfB Stuttgart
VfB Stuttgart II serves as Stuttgart's reserve team. The team's backbone consists of recent graduates from Stuttgart's youth teams and several established, older players who are not good enough for Stuttgart's first team. Players that are particularly impressive at Stuttgart II are often called up to become permanent members of the first-team. For example, Sami Khedira made 9 league appearances for Stuttgart II in the 2006–07 season, his final one coming on 24 September 2006, before he was called up the first-team; he made his Bundesliga debut on 1 October 2006.

The Robert-Schlienz Stadium
This stadium, offering 5000 places, all standing, was home for the VfB II until 2008, when they moved to the larger Gazi-Stadion auf der Waldau. It currently hosts the home games of VfB's A and B youth teams.  Initially known as the "Amateur-Stadion" (German for amateur stadium), the Robert-Schlienz Stadium got its name in honour of the well-known VfB player Robert Schlienz, after his death in June 1995.  The first game played here was in the 2nd round of the youth championship, on 25 June 1995, between the VfB's B youth team and Eintracht Frankfurt's.

Honours
The club's honours:

League
 German amateur championship
 Champions: 1963, 1980
 Runners-up: 1971
 Oberliga Baden-Württemberg (III-IV-V)
 Champions: 1980, 1998, 2003, 2020
 Amateurliga Württemberg (III)
 Champions: 1960
 Amateurliga Nordwürttemberg (III)
 Champions: 1963, 1964, 1965, 1967, 1971
 Verbandsliga Württemberg (IV)
 Champions: 1990

Cup
 Württemberg Cup
 Winners: 1970, 1980, 1981, 2000
 Runners-up: 1974, 1982, 2002

Recent coaches
The recent head coaches of the team:

Recent seasons
The recent season-by-season performance of the club:

 With the introduction of the Regionalligas in 1994 and the 3. Liga in 2008 as the new third tier, below the 2. Bundesliga, all leagues below dropped one tier.

Key

Players

Current squad

Out on loan

References

External links
Official site
Fussbaldaten profile 
VfB Stuttgart II at Weltfussball.de
Das deutsche Fußball-Archiv historical German domestic league tables 

German reserve football teams
Baden-Württemberg reserve football teams
VfB Stuttgart
Football clubs in Germany
Sport in Stuttgart
3. Liga clubs